Ablautus is a genus of robber flies in the family Asilidae.

Species
Ablautus arnaudi Wilcox, 1966
Ablautus basini Wilcox, 1966
Ablautus californicus Wilcox, 1935
Ablautus coachellus Wilcox, 1966
Ablautus colei Wilcox, 1966
Ablautus coquilletti Wilcox, 1935
Ablautus flavipes Coquillett, 1904
Ablautus linsleyi Wilcox, 1966
Ablautus mimus (Osten Sacken, 1877)
Ablautus rubens Coquillett, 1904
Ablautus rufotibialis Back, 1909
Ablautus schlingeri Wilcox, 1966
Ablautus trifarius Loew, 1866
Ablautus vanduzeei Wilcox, 1935

References

Asilidae genera